The 1904–05 Syracuse Orangemen men's basketball team represented Syracuse University during the 1904–05 college men's basketball season. The head coach was John A. R. Scott, coaching his second season with the Orangemen.

Roster

Clarence Houseknecht
Edmund Dollard
George Redlein
George Kirchgrasser
Art Powell
Max Rheil
John Stark
Charles Kinne
Arthur Brady
E. C. Parry

Source:

Schedule

|-

Source

References

External links
 OrangeHoops.com recap of 1904–05 season

Syracuse
Syracuse Orange men's basketball seasons
Syracuse Orange Basketball Team
Syracuse Orange Basketball Team